Mabel is an unincorporated community in Lane County, Oregon, United States.  Its post office was established around 1878 with Alfred Drury as  postmaster, and closed in 1957. The community was named after Maud Mabel Drury, the first postmaster's daughter.

References

Unincorporated communities in Lane County, Oregon
1878 establishments in Oregon
Populated places established in 1878
Unincorporated communities in Oregon